Ice Age is a 2002 American computer-animated adventure comedy film produced by Blue Sky Studios (in its debut film) and distributed by 20th Century Fox. The film was directed by Chris Wedge (in his feature directorial debut) and co-directed by Carlos Saldanha from a screenplay by Michael Berg, Michael J. Wilson, and Peter Ackerman and a story by Wilson, and features the voices of Ray Romano, John Leguizamo, Denis Leary, Goran Višnjić, and Jack Black. Set during the days of the Pleistocene ice age, the film centers around three main characters—Manny (Romano), a no-nonsense woolly mammoth; Sid (Leguizamo), a loudmouthed ground sloth; and Diego (Leary), a sardonic saber-toothed cat—who come across a human baby and work together to return it to its tribe. Additionally, the film occasionally follows Scrat, a speechless "saber-toothed squirrel" (Wedge), who is perpetually searching for a place in the ground to bury his acorn.

Ice Age was originally intended as a 2D animated film developed by Fox Animation Studios, but eventually became the first full-length animated film for the newly-reformed Blue Sky, which had been reshaped from a VFX house to a computer animation studio. Focus shifted from making an action-adventure drama film to a more comedy-oriented one, and several writers, such as Berg and Ackerman, were brought on to bring out a wittier tone.

The film was released in the United States on March 15, 2002. It received mostly positive reviews from critics and was nominated at the 75th Academy Awards for Best Animated Feature. It was a box office success and grossed over $383.2 million, making it the eighth highest-grossing film of 2002 and the highest-grossing animated film of 2002. It started the Ice Age franchise, being followed by four sequels: Ice Age: The Meltdown (2006), Ice Age: Dawn of the Dinosaurs (2009), Ice Age: Continental Drift (2012), and Ice Age: Collision Course (2016). A sixth installment, The Ice Age Adventures of Buck Wild, was produced by Walt Disney Pictures without the involvement of Blue Sky Studios and released as a direct-to-streaming film on Disney+ in 2022. Two holiday specials were also released: 2011's Ice Age: A Mammoth Christmas (taking place between Dawn of the Dinosaurs and Continental Drift) and 2016's Ice Age: The Great Egg-Scapade (taking place between Continental Drift and Collision Course). Several Ice Age short films were also released between 2002 and 2022.

Plot
Scrat, a squirrel, attempts to find a place to store his acorn for the winter. Eventually, as he tries to stomp it into the ground, he inadvertently causes a large crack to form in the ice that extends for miles before setting off a large avalanche which nearly crushes him. He barely escapes but finds himself getting stepped on by a herd of prehistoric animals migrating south in order to escape the forthcoming ice age. Sid, a clumsy ground sloth, is left behind by his family and decides to move on by himself, but is attacked by a pair of Brontotheres after accidentally ruining their meal and making them angry. Sid is soon rescued by Manny, a mammoth heading north, who fights the rhinos off and continues on his path. Sid joins Manny, not wanting to be alone and unprotected. Manny is annoyed by Sid's outgoing demeanor and wishes to migrate on his own, but Sid nonetheless continues to follow Manny. Meanwhile, Soto, the leader of a Smilodon pack, wants revenge on a human tribe for killing half of his pack by eating the chief's infant son, Roshan, alive. Soto leads a raid on the human camp, during which Roshan's mother flees with her son. Cornered by Soto’s lieutenant, Diego, she leaps down the waterfall with Roshan. As punishment for his failure to retrieve the boy, Diego is sent to find and retrieve him while the rest of the pack waits for him at a mountain known as Half-Peak. If he fails, he will be killed in Roshan’s place.

Later, Sid and Manny encounter the mother struggling out of the lake, dying from her plunge. The mother only has enough strength to entrust Roshan to Manny before she dies and disappears into the water. After much persuasion by Sid, they decide to return the baby, but when they reach the human settlement, they find it deserted. They meet up with Diego, who convinces the pair to let him help by tracking the humans. Manny does not trust Diego's intentions towards the baby, so in order to keep an eye on him, decides that he will lead the way. Like Manny, Diego is also easily annoyed by Sid's chatterbox personality. The four travel on, with Diego secretly leading them to Half-Peak where his pack is waiting to ambush them. 

After encountering several misadventures on their way, with Manny slowly beginning to like Sid and trust Diego, the group reaches a cave with several cave paintings. There, Sid and Diego learn about Manny's past and his previous interactions with the human hunters, in which they slaughtered his family, consisting of his mate and child, leaving Manny a depressed loner. Later, the group almost reaches their destination, Half-Peak, only to encounter a forming river of lava. Manny and Sid, along with Roshan, make it across safely, but Diego ends up hanging on a cliff, about to fall into the lava. Manny saves him, narrowly missing certain death by falling into the lava himself. The herd takes a break for the night, and Roshan takes his first walking steps towards Diego, who starts to have a change of heart about his mission.

The next day, the herd approaches the ambush, causing Diego, now full of respect for Manny for saving his life and having also grown to like Sid, to change his mind and confess to Manny and Sid about the ambush. As the pair turn hostile towards him, Diego pleads for their trust and tries to foil the attack. The herd battles Soto's pack, but despite their efforts, Soto and his associates manage to corner Manny. As Soto closes in for the kill on Manny, Diego jumps in the way and is injured as a result. Manny then knocks a distracted Soto into a rock wall, causing several sharp icicles to fall onto Soto, impaling and instantly killing him. Horrified, the rest of the pack retreat. Manny and Sid mourn for Diego's injury, which they believe is fatal, and continue their journey without him. The two manage to successfully return Roshan to his tribe, and to their surprise, a recovered Diego manages to rejoin them in time to see Roshan leave. The trio then begin to head off to warmer climates as best friends.

Twenty thousand years later, Scrat, frozen in a block of ice, ends up on the shores of a tropical island. As the ice slowly melts, an acorn that was also frozen in the same ice block is washed away. Scrat then finds a coconut and tries to stomp it into the ground, only to accidentally trigger a volcanic eruption.

Cast

The characters are all prehistoric animals.  The animals can talk to and understand each other and are voiced by a variety of famous actors.  Like many films of prehistoric life, the rules of time periods apply very loosely, as many of the species shown in the film never actually lived in the same time periods or the same geographic regions.
 Ray Romano as Manfred "Manny", a woolly mammoth
 John Leguizamo as Sid, a Megalonyx
 Denis Leary as Diego, a Smilodon
 Goran Višnjić as Soto, a Smilodon
 Jack Black as Zeke, a Smilodon
 Cedric the Entertainer as Carl, an Embolotherium
 Stephen Root as Frank, a Megacerops
 Diedrich Bader as Oscar, a Smilodon
 Alan Tudyk as Lenny, a Homotherium
 Jane Krakowski and Lorri Bagley as Rachel and Jennifer, respectively, a pair of female giant ground sloths
 Chris Wedge as Scrat, a Cronopio
 Tara Strong as Roshan, a human infant. He is never referred to by name in the film, instead being nicknamed “Pinky” by Manny

Production

Development 
Ice Age was originally pitched to 20th Century Fox in 1997 by producer Lori Forte. The film, originally envisioned as a traditionally animated movie with an action-oriented comedy-drama tone, was intended to be developed by Don Bluth and Gary Goldman's Fox Animation Studios. Around the same time, Blue Sky Studios, a small visual effects studio in White Plains, New York, was bought out by Fox and reshaped into a full-fledged CG animation film studio. In light of this, Fox Animation head Chris Meledandri and executive producer Steve Bannerman approached Forte with the proposition of developing the film as a computer-animated movie, which Forte realized was "basically a no-brainer," according to her. Michael J. Wilson, who had written and developed the film's original story treatments in conjunction with Forte, wrote the first draft for the script, and Chris Wedge, a co-founder of Blue Sky, was brought on to the project as the director in late 1998. Fox also opted for the movie to take a more comedy-oriented direction, and brought writer Michael Berg to help emphasize a more comedic tone. After being hired, Berg reportedly told the studio that he couldn't write a film made for children, to which the studio responded, "Great! Just write a good story."

Story development began in spring 1999, and official production on the film began in June 2000, one week after the closure of Fox Animation Studios. 150 employees were hired to work on the film, and a budget of $58 million was granted by Fox. Peter Ackerman was hired as a third writer for the film, and collaborated extensively with Berg for three years before the two eventually moved on from the project. Jon Vitti and Mike Reiss, both former writers for The Simpsons, were added later on after Berg and Ackerman left to further polish the script.

For research, the film's development team took several trips to the Museum of Natural History early on in production in order to make sure that the film authentically felt like the Ice Age. Ultimately, the team translated the information that they had compiled in their research by stylizing it in order to fit with the film's story. A team of 32 animators went out and did research to figure out the movements of different animals; for instance, for the movement of Scrat, animators visited a park and observed local squirrels, taking note of their "twitchy" way of moving.

Writing and character development 
Michael J. Wilson stated on his blog that his daughter Flora came up with the idea for an animal that was a mixture of both squirrel and rat, naming it Scrat, and that the animal was obsessed with pursuing his acorn. The plan to have Scrat talk was quickly dropped, as he worked better as a silent character for comedic effect. The name 'Scrat' is a combination of the words 'squirrel' and 'rat', as Scrat has characteristics of both species; Wedge has also called him "saber-toothed squirrel." Scrat's opening adventure was inserted because, without it, the first real snow and ice sequence wouldn't take place until about 37 minutes into the film. This was the only role intended for Scrat, but he proved to be such a popular character with test audiences that he was given more scenes. The filmmakers made it so that many of the scenes with Scrat appear directly after dramatic moments in the film.

In a 2012 interview with Jay Leno, Denis Leary revealed that his character, Diego, originally died near the end of the film. However, it was reported that kids in the test audience burst into tears when his death was shown. Leary warned the producers that something like this would happen. When it was proven true, the scene was re-written to ensure Diego survived.

Originally, Sid was supposed to be a con-artist and a hustler, and there was a finished scene of the character conning some aardvark kids. His character was later changed to a talkative-clumsy sloth because the team felt the audience would have disliked him. There was also an alternate scene of Sid in the hottub with the ladies which shows him saying to them "Let's jump in the gene pool and see what happens." One of the female sloths then kicks him in the groin. This was cut because it was not suitable for children and may have gotten the film a PG-13 rating. Other innuendos with Sid were also cut from the film. Sid was also supposed to have a female sloth named Sylvia (voiced by Kristen Johnston) chasing after him, whom he despised and kept ditching. All the removed scenes can be seen on the DVD.

Animation 
The characters and environments in Ice Age were modeled and animated using WaveFront's Maya animation software. Rendering was completed using CGI Studio, an in-house ray tracing program being developed since Blue Sky's formation in 1987 and previously used for Wedge's 1998 short film, Bunny. While Jimmy Neutron: Boy Genius, released three months before Ice Age, became the first computer-animated film to make use of ray tracing technology, Ice Age would have received the distinction had it been released at the time Blue Sky began work on the movie.

In order to keep the film at a more exciting pace, the development team took certain liberties with Sid in terms of realism; although real-life ground sloths were slow-moving and rigid, Sid was given a fast movement speed in certain scenes, as well as a more flexible range of motions. Conversely, the character’s arm movements were more restricted in order to retain a sense of laziness true to the nature of sloths. Manny was a particularly difficult character to animate due to his unique attributes as a mammoth, such as his long fur and massive trunks that covered up his face. Dealing with a creature which had seldom appeared in animation at the time, the team needed to figure out how Manny would realistically move with character designer Pete DeSeve explaining that “a wooly mammoth isn’t simply an elephant with long fur”. According to co-director Carlos Saldanha, Diego was one of the most complexly animated characters in the movie, with some scenes showing off his high movement speed as a sabre-toothed tiger while others kept his movement more contained and focused on his facial expressions to carry the moment.

Voice casting 
The voice cast of Ice Age was encouraged to make up their own dialogue during recording. Several lines in the film were improvised by the actors.

For Manny, the studio was initially looking at people with big voices. James Earl Jones and Ving Rhames were considered, but they sounded too obvious and Wedge wanted more comedy. Instead, the role was given to Ray Romano because they thought his voice sounded very elephant-like. Wedge described Romano's voice as deep and slow in delivery, but also with a "sarcastic wit behind it."

John Leguizamo, who provided the voice for Sid, experimented with over 40 voices for the character, including a slower-sounding voice to fit with the lazy nature of a giant sloth. Leguizamo came up with the final voice and trademark lateral lisp for the character after watching footage of sloths and learning that they store food in the pockets of their mouths which ferments over time. Leguizamo remarked in an interview with BBC that he had wanted to contribute to an animated project for a while, claiming that cartoon voice actor Mel Blanc was "one of my comedy Gods" and a large source of inspiration for him as a child.

Music 
The official soundtrack to Ice Age was released on May 14, 2002 by Varèse Sarabande. The soundtrack consists of the original musical score composed for the film by David Newman and performed by the Hollywood Studio Symphony. The song "Send Me on My Way" by Rusted Root is also featured in the film but is absent from the album.

Reception

Box office
Ice Age was released on March 15, 2002, and had a $46.3 million opening weekend, a large number not usually seen until the summer season, and way ahead of Fox's most optimistic projection of about $30 million. Ice Age broke Liar Liars record for a March opening (later surpassed in 2006 by its sequel, Ice Age: The Meltdown) and at the time was the third-best opening ever for an animated feature—after Monsters, Inc. ($62.6 million) and Toy Story 2 ($57.4 million). Ice Age finished its domestic box office run with $176,387,405 and grossed $383,257,136 worldwide, being the 9th highest gross of 2002 in North America and the 8th best worldwide at the time. It was one of the two animated films of that year to make over $100 million, with the other one being Lilo & Stitch.

Critical response
The site's consensus reads: "Even though Ice Age is treading over the same grounds as Monsters, Inc. and Shrek, it has enough wit and laughs to stand on its own." Similar site Metacritic had a score of 60% out of 31 reviews, meaning "mixed or average reviews". Roger Ebert of the Chicago Sun-Times gave the film 3 stars out of 4 and wrote "I came to scoff and stayed to smile". Elvis Mitchell of the New York Times called the film a "blandly likeable computer-animation extravaganza", comparing the film's plot to the Western film 3 Godfathers.

CinemaScore polls conducted during the opening weekend, cinema audiences gave Ice Age an average grade of "A" on an A+ to F scale.

Accolades
Ice Age was nominated for the Academy Award for Best Animated Feature in 2003, losing to Spirited Away.

The film is recognized by American Film Institute in these lists:
 2008: AFI's 10 Top 10:
 Nominated Animation Film

Home media
The initial home video release for Ice Age was accompanied by an $85 million marketing campaign involving promotional partnerships with 14 different companies, including Microsoft, Pizza Hut, Carl's Jr., Dole, Langer's, Valpak, Cold Stone Creamery, and the National Hockey League. The movie was released on 2-disc DVD, VHS and D-Theater on November 26, 2002. All three releases included Gone Nutty, a short film starring Scrat and detailing his further antics as he tries to bury his acorn. The DVD release was THX certified and gave the viewer the option of viewing the film in either widescreen or pan and scan fullscreen. Another single disc release was released on February 5, 2005, and the next year a new two-disc release with extra features on March 14, 2006. The film was released on Blu-ray on March 4, 2008, and beside Gone Nutty, it included 9 minutes of deleted scenes.

Ice Age was included on The Walt Disney Company's streaming service Disney+ on March 1, 2020.

Video game

A tie-in video game was developed by Artificial Mind and Movement and published by Ubisoft for the Game Boy Advance. A platform game, it has the player controlling Sid and Manny through 10 levels as they carry Roshan. The game holds an aggregate ranking of 46.00% on GameRankings and 47/100 on Metacritic.

Sequels

Since the release of Ice Age, several sequels have followed. Ice Age: The Meltdown, the first sequel, was released on March 31, 2006, following the main characters trying to escape a massive flooding due to global warming, as well as Manny's concern over whether or not his species is going extinct. A third installment, Ice Age: Dawn of the Dinosaurs, was released in 2009, followed by a fourth film, Ice Age: Continental Drift, in 2012. The fifth and latest installment, Ice Age: Collision Course, was released on July 22, 2016.  With the release of Collision Course, the Ice Age series became the first computer-animated movie franchise to house five theatrical installments, not including spinoffs. The sequels suffered a decline in critical reception, but were still box-office successes.

Following Disney’s purchase of 20th Century Fox in 2019 and the closure of Blue Sky Studios in 2021, a spin-off film titled The Ice Age Adventures of Buck Wild and produced by Walt Disney Pictures was released directly to streaming on Disney+ in 2022.

See also
 List of animated feature-length films
 List of computer-animated films
 3 Godfathers, a 1948 Western film with a similar plot
 Pleistocene megafauna

References

External links

 
 
 
 

2002 films
2002 animated films
2002 computer-animated films
2000s American animated films
2002 fantasy films
20th Century Fox films
20th Century Fox animated films
20th Century Fox Animation films
American computer-animated films
Animated films about animals
Animated films about squirrels
Blue Sky Studios films
2000s children's comedy films
2000s children's fantasy films
2002 directorial debut films
Films scored by David Newman
Films about elephants
Films directed by Carlos Saldanha
Films directed by Chris Wedge
Films produced by Lori Forte
Films with screenplays by Michael Berg
Films with screenplays by Michael J. Wilson
Ice Age (franchise) films
Fiction about neanderthals
American road movies
Animated films about friendship
2000s road movies
2002 comedy films
Avalanches in film
2000s English-language films